Live 2018 is the second live album by the American rock band Stone Temple Pilots, released as a Record Store Day exclusive on November 23, 2018 through Rhino.  It's the first live album since Alive in the Windy City in 2012 and the deaths of original frontman Scott Weiland in 2015 and Chester Bennington in 2017.

Track listing

Personnel
Stone Temple Pilots
 Jeff Gutt – lead vocals, backing vocals
 Dean DeLeo – guitar, production
 Robert DeLeo – bass, backing vocals, production
 Eric Kretz – drums, percussion

References

2018 live albums
Stone Temple Pilots albums
Rhino Records live albums
Record Store Day releases